Will to Power is an American dance-pop group that originated in southern Florida in the mid-1980s. The group recorded a number of hit singles on the Billboard dance and pop charts in the late 1980s and early 1990s, most notably "Baby, I Love Your Way/Freebird Medley", a medley of 1970s hits by Peter Frampton and Lynyrd Skynyrd that reached the top of the Billboard Hot 100 chart in December 1988.

While signed to Epic Records, they released their self-titled debut album in 1988, however, it only charted to #68 on the Billboard 200, despite charting two Top 50 singles, along with Will to Power's only Number One single on the Billboard Hot 100, "Baby, I Love Your Way/Freebird Medley".

Albums

Studio albums

Compilation albums

Extended plays

Singles

References

Discographies of American artists
Pop music group discographies